Tessin bei Boizenburg is a municipality  in the Ludwigslust-Parchim district, in Mecklenburg-Vorpommern, Germany.

References

Populated places established in the 13th century
Ludwigslust-Parchim